A Gorn address (Gorn, 1967) is a method of identifying and addressing any node within a tree data structure. This notation is often used for identifying nodes in a parse tree defined by phrase structure rules.

The Gorn address is a sequence of zero or more integers conventionally separated by dots, e.g., 0 or 1.0.1. 
The root which Gorn calls * can be regarded as the empty sequence. 
And the -th child of the -th child has an address , counting from 0.

It is named after American computer scientist Saul Gorn.

References

Gorn, S. (1967). Explicit definitions and linguistic dominoes. Systems and Computer Science, Eds. J. Hart & S. Takasu. 77-115. University of Toronto Press, Toronto Canada.

Natural language processing